Esprit-Saint is a municipality in Rimouski-Neigette Regional County Municipality in the Bas-Saint-Laurent region of Quebec, Canada. Its population as of the Canada 2016 Census was 341.

See also
Touladi River
List of municipalities in Quebec

References

External links 

Municipalities in Quebec
Incorporated places in Bas-Saint-Laurent